Lets Push It is the debut album by Scottish house music project Nightcrawlers, featuring vocalist John Reid. It was released in 1995. The album includes two singles which reached the UK top 10: "Push the Feeling On" and "Surrender Your Love", which were both also big hits throughout Europe, plus three further singles which reached the UK top 40: "Don't Let the Feeling Go", "Let's Push It" and "Should I Ever (Fall in Love)".

Critical reception

Music & Media'''s reviewer commented, "Kicking off with the three pop house hits in the right sequence, here's your party album of the year." A reviewer from Music Week'' wrote, "John Reid and his pals push their distinctive sound to the limits on this collection which included their hits with remixes by MK and Tin Tin Out."

Track listing
"Push the Feeling On" (MK Dub Revisited Edit) (Graham Wilson, Hugh Brankin, John Reid, Ross Campbell)
"Surrender Your Love" (Reid, Marc Kinchen)
"Don't Let the Feeling Go" (Reid, Kinchen, Ronald Wilson)
"Should I Ever (Fall in Love)" (Reid, R. Wilson, Stuart Crichton)
"Just Like Before" (Brankin, Reid, R. Wilson, Campbell)
"Lift Me Up" (John Holiday, R. Wilson, Trevor Steel)
"The World Turned" (Brankin, Reid, R. Wilson, Campbell)
"Let's Push It" (Reid, Michael McEvoy, R. Wilson, Stepz)
"I Like It" (Reid, McEvoy, R. Wilson, Stepz)
"All Over the World" (Reid, McEvoy, R. Wilson, Crichton)
"Push the Feeling On" (The Dub of Doom Mix)
"Surrender Your Love" (MK Club Mix)
"Don't Let the Feeling Go" (Tin Tin Out Vocal Mix)

Charts

References

External links
Lets Push It at Discogs

1995 debut albums
Arista Records albums
Bertelsmann Music Group albums
House music albums by Scottish artists